Santo Niño, officially the Municipality of Santo Niño (Jawi: ايڠايد نو سنتو نيڽو), is a 3rd class municipality in the province of South Cotabato, Philippines. According to the 2020 census, it has a population of 39,796 people.

History
The municipality's name was derived from its patron saint, the “Santo Niño”, or the Holy Child. It was formerly called Barrio Trece (13) (although many still called the town proper this name) of the Norala Settlement District of then National Land Settlement Administration.

The Sangguniang Panlalawigan (Provincial Council) of South Cotabato passed a resolution in 1980 requesting then Assemblyman Jose T. Sison to file a bill at the Philippine Parliament to create Santo Niño a municipality. Parliament Bill No. 1220 was finally passed and approved on December 23, 1980, when Ferdinand Marcos signed it into law as Batas Pambansa Bilang 90. In a plebiscite held on April 7, 1981, the law was ratified.

Municipal mayors:
 Dr. Norberto Oliveros (1981-1986)
 Dr. Geronimo Dabalus, appointed by the Aquino Government after the 1986 EDSA Revolution (1986-1988)
 Antonio F. Damandaman, Sr. (1988-1998) 
 Dr. Ervin B. Luntao (1998-2007)
 Antonio F. Damandaman, Sr. (2007–2016)
 Pablo M. Matinong, Jr. (2016–2020)
 Sulpicio F. Villalobos (2020–present)

Geography
Situated in the fertile Allah Valley, it is the smallest municipality by land area in the province.

It is bounded by the Municipality of Norala (its mother-town) in the north, the Municipality of Surallah in the east, Allah River and the Municipality of Bagumbayan, Sultan Kudarat in the south, and the Municipality of Isulan, Sultan Kudarat in the west.

Climate

Barangays
Santo Niño is politically subdivided into 10 barangays.

 Ambalgan
 Guinsang-an (Bo.4)
 Katipunan (Bo.11)
 Manuel Roxas (Bo.10)
 New Panay (Bo.9)
 Poblacion (Bo. 13)
 San Isidro (Bo. 12)
 San Vicente (Bo. 5)
 Teresita
 Sajaneba

Demographics

The population is highly literate.

While the most spoken language is Hiligaynon, everyone can speak Tagalog, some Cebuano, and basic conversational English.

Barangay Ambalgan is predominantly Maguindanaoan Muslims and are considered the ethnic inhabitants of the municipality. The rest of the barangays are predominantly Christian settlers who first arrived in the area in the 1940s.

The municipality is generally peaceful with relatively low crime incident.

Economy

Rice production is the primary industry. The well-irrigated rice-lands of the municipality are possible due to the presence of a river irrigation system which is provided by a dam at Allah River at Barangay M. Roxas.

Corn (maize) is the secondary product. Copra is also produced.

Small businesses which provide basic necessities thrive.

Tourism
 Bugtong Bukid, a hill along the national highway west to Isulan at Barangay M. Roxas. The municipal government had invested in a swimming pool project in this area sometime in the 1990s but was closed due to mismanagement and lack of maintenance. Nonetheless, this hill is a geological wonder in itself being the only hill of its kind in the area. Folklore also has it that the huge acacia tree near the hill is home to a kapre.
 The steel bridge that traversed Allah River and connects the municipality to nearby barangays of Bagumbayan, Sultan Kudarat. The bridge is an excellent location for an afternoon stroll. Carabaos take their baths in late afternoon at the river; time your visit during these hours.

Transportation
The Santo Nino Public Terminal is a hub for public utility buses and vans that travel to Koronadal City via Surallah and Banga. Travel time from Santo Nino to Koronadal City is around 30 minutes.

General Santos, where the General Santos International Airport is located, is accessible by public buses and vans from Koronadal City. Travel time from Koronadal City to General Santos is about one hour.

Travel within the municipality is through public utility tricycles and motorcycles.

Healthcare
The Municipal Health Office at the Municipal Hall Compound provides services for consultations.

Private clinics include:
 Dr. Ervin B. Luntao Family Clinic and Hospital
 Dr. Zenaida Maglaya Clinic
 St. Jude Clinic and Hospital
There are a number of small pharmacies at the municipality.

Education
The municipality has a number of public and private schools. These are:

High Schools
 Santo Nino National School of Arts and Trades (public), at Barangay San Isidro
 Santo Nino National High School (public), at Poblacion
 Notre Dame of Santo Nino (private, a diocesan school), at Poblacion
 Public high schools in (New) Panay, Katipunan, and Guinsang-an

Elementary Schools
 Santo Nino Central Elementary School (public elementary school), at Poblacion
 Public elementary schools at other nine barangays (Katipunan,Guinsang-an, Ambalgan. San Isidro, Sajaneba, M. Roxas)
 Notre Dame of Santo Nino (private, a diocesan school), at Poblacion
 Montessori Casa Precious Jewels (private elementary school), at Poblacion

References

External links
 Santo Niño Profile at PhilAtlas.com
   Santo Niño Profile at the DTI Cities and Municipalities Competitive Index
 [ Philippine Standard Geographic Code]
Philippine Census Information

Municipalities of South Cotabato